Ramón Lopez-Irizarry  (July 25, 1897 – October 8, 1982) was an educator and scientist who invented an easier way to extract the cream from the coconut pulp and developed the original formula of Coco López.

Early years
Ramón López-Irizarry, born in Cabo Rojo, Puerto Rico,  was a professor of agricultural sciences at the University of Puerto Rico.  In the late 1940s, the Government of Puerto Rico gave a grant to the University of Puerto Rico to assist in the development of Puerto Rican  industries.

Coco López

In 1949, López-Irizarry, with the use of some of these funds, was able to work in his laboratory on an idea that he had. López-Irizarry set out to find an easier way to extract the cream from the coconut pulp. The heart of the coconut has always been an important ingredient in many of the desserts in Puerto Rico.  The main problem was extracting the coconut cream from the pulp which was a difficult task.  López-Irizarry discovered an easier way by blending the cream from the hearts of the Caribbean coconuts with an exact proportion of natural cane sugar.  He named the product which he developed Coco López.

López-Irizarry kept the ingredients of the product a secret. The project was so successful that López-Irizarry soon left the University and commercialized it. Coco López became the basis for the famous piña colada drink, which made its first appearance in 1954.  The piña colada is also known as the "Official Beverage of Puerto Rico".

Later years
López-Irizarry was very successful. He packaged his product at the Industrias La Famosa canning factory, owned by Wilbert Parkhurst and family, for years. In 1966, he sold the brand to the Parkhurst family who later forged a deal with David Ballachow to distribute the product in the United States. Eventually the Parkhurst family sold the brand to the Borden company. López-Irizarry's Coco López can be found in supermarkets worldwide.

Personal life
López-Irizarry was married to Georgina Ramírez-Banuchi and had four children: Rosabel, Myrna, Ramón and Jorge. He resided in Ocean Park, San Juan, where he spent his last years. Ramón López-Irizarry died a multi-millionaire on October 8, 1982.

See also

List of Puerto Ricans
Puerto Rican scientists and inventors

Notes

References

External links
Proquest Industrial Newspaper
Cream of coconut Coco López
 Blending Business with Pleasure

1897 births
1982 deaths
People from Cabo Rojo, Puerto Rico
Puerto Rican educators
20th-century Puerto Rican businesspeople
Puerto Rican scientists
Puerto Rican inventors
University of Puerto Rico faculty
20th-century inventors